The Codex Laud, or Laudianus, (catalogued as MS. Laud Misc. 678, Bodleian Library in Oxford) is a sixteenth-century Mesoamerican codex named for William Laud, an English archbishop who was the former owner. It is from the Borgia Group, and is a pictorial manuscript consisting of 24 leaves (48 pages) from Central Mexico, dating from before the Spanish takeover. It is evidently incomplete (part of it is lost).

In its content, it is similar to Codex Bodley and Codex Borgia. It is published (with an "Introduction" by C. A. Burland) in Volume XI of CODICES SELECTI of the Akademische Druck- u. Verlagsanstalt, Graz.

The Bodleian Library holds four other Mesoamerican codices: Codex Bodley, Codex Mendoza, Codex Selden and the Selden Roll.

Gallery

References

 
Facsimile: odex Laud, Oxford, Bodleian Library, Ms. Laud Misc. 678, pre-colonial, Akademische Druck- u. Verlagsanstalt (ADEVA) Graz 1966. Colour facsimile edition of the Old Mexican manuscript. 48 pp., size: 165 x 155 mm. Encased in box with leather spine. Scholarly introduction: C. A. Burland, London, 42 pp. text, 4 plates on art print paper, 1 table. CODICES SELECTI, Vol. XI

External links 
 A.D.V.G. facsimile of the Laud Codex
 Codex Laud, digitised by J.Willard Marriott Library, University of Utah
 Codex Laud commentary, Akademische Druck-u. Verlagsanstalt [1966] edition, digitised by J.Willard Marriott Library, University of Utah
 MS Laud. Misc. 678 Images available on Digital Bodleian
 MS Laud Misc. 678 In the Bodleian Libraries Catalogue of Medieval Manuscripts

Laud
Bodleian Library collection
Middle American pictorial manuscripts